Sky Bridge 721 is a suspension footbridge that is the longest of its kind in the world, a record previously held by Gandaki Golden Footbridge. Built in the municipality of Dolní Morava, Czech Republic, the bridge is 721 metres long and is at a height of up to 95 metres off the ground. It first opened to the general public on 13 May 2022.

Located in the Králický Sněžník mountain, it offers users panoramic views of the landscape. The suspension bridge spans the valley of the Mlýnský Stream, from the ridge of Slamník Mountain to the ridge of Chlum Mountain; it is 1,125 metres above sea level on one side and 1,135 metres above sea level on the other.

An "educational nature trail" called "The Bridge of Time" was prepared with elements of augmented reality in cooperation with the state-owned enterprise Lesy ČR (Forests of the Czech Republic) and the Museum of Czechoslovak Fortifications of 1935–1938. A game with ten educational panels covers the topics of environmental protection and how to behave in the countryside, as well as the history and life story of a family from Dolní Morava against the backdrop of events that affected Czechoslovakia / the Czech Republic from 1935 until now.

See also
Arouca 516
Gandaki Golden Footbridge, former longest footbridge

References

Pedestrian bridges in the Czech Republic
Suspension bridges
Bridges completed in 2022
2022 establishments in the Czech Republic
21st-century architecture in the Czech Republic